Robert Badjie (born 20 February 1984) is a Gambian football goalkeeper who is currently playing for Swedish Division 3 side Ik Viljan.

External links

1984 births
Living people
Gambian footballers
Association football goalkeepers
Hakoah Maccabi Amidar Ramat Gan F.C. players
Hapoel Jerusalem F.C. players
Liga Leumit players
Israeli Premier League players
Expatriate footballers in Israel
Gambian expatriate sportspeople in Israel